Imperial Airport  is located  east of Imperial, Saskatchewan, Canada.

See also 
 List of airports in Saskatchewan
 List of defunct airports in Canada

References

External links 
Page about this airport on COPA's Places to Fly airport directory

Defunct airports in Saskatchewan
Big Arm No. 251, Saskatchewan